You're Not You is a 2014 American drama film directed by George C. Wolfe and written by Shana Feste and Jordan Roberts, based on the 2006 novel of the same name by Michelle Wildgen. The film stars Hilary Swank, Emmy Rossum and Josh Duhamel. It was released on October 10, 2014.

Plot
Kate Parker is a classical pianist who is diagnosed with ALS. Her husband Evan finds out one morning that his wife has fired her previous caregiver, Mrs. Trotter, and is looking for a replacement. Bec Cartwell, a wild college student who parties a lot, applies for the job despite her lack of experience - apart from having volunteered at a nursing home her grandmother was placed in during her high school years. Kate sees something special in Bec despite her slightly vulgar language and poor housekeeping skills. Yet, despite all the mayhem Bec has caused at home, from messing up the kitchen by blending up a drink without putting the lid on the blender to dropping Kate in the bathroom, Kate maintains a calm and positive demeanor which confuses Bec. One night, Kate has her friends over and finds out that Evan had gone out for drinks instead of having dinner, unlike what he told her. Later that night, Kate convinces Bec to access Evan's laptop and they find out that Evan had an affair with his secretary, Cynthia. Distraught, Kate tells Bec to leave, however Bec comes rushing over to Kate's during a night out in a bar when she gets a text from Kate. Bec finds Kate at the top of the stairs after a suicide attempt where Kate had almost let herself fall down a flight of stairs. Kate then asks Bec to get her away from home. They end up staying the night. In the morning she tells Bec to take her to an assisted living home, but Bec refuses to leave her there and is furious that Kate blames herself for ruining Evan's life with her ALS. Eventually, Kate splits up with Evan due to his brief affair, as well as her wanting not to be invisible after receiving a brief and angry pep talk by Bec.

Bec and Kate have a couple of adventures, including going to a club, meeting another couple where the wife has ALS and trying "herbal therapy." They eventually go to a party for Kate's friend's daughter. Kate asks to hold the baby, but has a coughing fit and almost drops the baby. While Bec is taking care of Kate inside, Evan appears and Kate has Bec tell him her true motivation for leaving, that it was a result of him making her feel invisible. The wife from the couple they met earlier has a complication due to her condition and is hospitalized. It scares Kate when she sees what happens eventually to ALS patients. Bec briefly talks to Kate's "best friends" who ask her to tell Kate that they love, miss and are there for her. Evan visits the house again, but Kate and Bec turn him away again. Bec's parents visit for Christmas and a conversation with her Mom, heard by Kate, causes Kate to fire Bec because she believes that her illness is ruining Bec's life just like it did with Evan.

Kate goes to her parents' house and attends a Christmas party with Evan, hinting that they are together again. Eventually, Bec receives news that Marilyn, the other ALS patient they met, has died. She drops off a letter with Evan for Kate that Marilyn sent to some of her friends. Kate becomes hospitalized shortly after and it is discovered that Bec was given medical authority over Kate. Even though Kate's mother begs her to put Kate on a ventilator, Bec refuses and instead takes her home with Evan. Bec helps Kate play her favorite Chopin piece on the piano again. After Evan professes his love for her, Kate and Bec lie in bed, where Kate makes Bec promise not to call for help tonight and to find someone for herself who can see her. Bec agrees, on the condition that Kate promises to accept a compliment. And Bec thanks her for the Manolos they shared, teaching her how to cook, and letting her experience this with Kate and not letting her mess up this job. Kate dies that night and Bec, unable to stay in the other room, holds her while she takes her last breaths. The movie ends with Bec finally meeting with Will, a nice boy who has been pursuing her, and performing at the club without suffering from stage fright.

Cast

Release
The film was distributed in North America by Entertainment One Films and released on October 10, 2014 in limited release, grossing $11,486 from 5 screens. It was released on DVD on April 13, 2015.

The film opened in Italy on August 27, 2015, debuting in fifth place with a total gross of $153,892 in its opening weekend.

The film grossed $11,486 during its limited release, and $894,964 worldwide.

Reception
On Rotten Tomatoes, the film holds an approval rating of 48% based on 23 reviews, with an average rating of 5.6/10. The site's critical consensus reads, "Despite the best efforts of its two talented female leads, You're Not You is not a consistently satisfying adaptation of its source material". On Metacritic, the film has a weighted average score of 56 out of 100, based on 8 critics, indicating "mixed or average reviews".

Background and dedication 
The idea for the film came from producer Alison Greenspan, whose father Stephen Greenspan, former vice president of data carrier manufacturer Seagate Technology, himself contracted ALS in 2004 and died in 2009, as did Alison Greenspan's aunt Marilyn in 2011. Therefore, Alison Greenspan dedicated this film in the credits to her father, Stephen, who died from ALS.

References

External links 
 
 

2014 films
2014 drama films
2010s American films
2010s English-language films
American drama films
Entertainment One films
Films about diseases
Films based on American novels
Films directed by George C. Wolfe
Films produced by Denise Di Novi
Films scored by Jeanine Tesori
Films shot in Los Angeles
Films about disability